Cornuspiracea comprise a superfamily of miliolid forams (Loeblich & Tappan, 1988) in which the test may be free or attached, planispiral or trochospiral, evolute or involute, spreading or discoidal. The proloculus, or initial chamber, is followed by undivided spiral passage or enrolled tubular chamber, later may be irregularly coiled, unicoiled, or show zigzag growth pattern and may be distinctly chambered.
The test wall is composed of imperforate porcelaneous calcite, a character of the Miliolida

Families and genera in the Cornuspiracea were removed from the Miliolacea where they appear in the Treatise Part C (Loeblich & Tappan 1964).

References

 A.R. Loeblich Jr and Helen Tappan, 1964. Sarcodina Chiefly "Thecamoebians" and Foraminiferida; Treatise on Invertebrate Paleontology, Part C Protista 2. Geological Society of America and University of Kansas Press. 
 A.R. Loeblich Jr and Helen Tappan,1988.
Forminiferal Genera and their Classification.

Tubothalamea
Foraminifera superfamilies